The Mystery of the Poet (Italian:Il mistero del poeta) is an 1888 novel by the Italian writer Antonio Fogazzaro. It is a melodramatic story of the romance between a poet and a fragile woman.

References

Bibliography
 Brand, Peter & Pertile, Lino. The Cambridge History of Italian Literature. Cambridge University Press, 1999. 

1888 novels
19th-century Italian novels
Novels set in Italy
Novels by Antonio Fogazzaro